I Just Can't Stop It is the debut studio album by British ska band The Beat, released on 23 May 1980 by Go-Feet Records in the United Kingdom. It was released the same year in the United States on Sire Records under the band name "The English Beat". In Australia, it was released on Go-Feet under the band name "The British Beat".

Well received from the start, publications such as Rolling Stone raved that the music was "wild and threatening, sexy and sharp." AllMusic later said it "was a stunning achievement", which has not been diminished by time.

The album was reissued on CD in 1990 by I.R.S. Records in the US, and in 2012 by Edsel Records in the UK and Shout! Factory in the US.

Artwork
The "Beat Girl" icon seen on the cover, and used on the band's merchandising, was designed by Birmingham-based cartoonist Hunt Emerson.

Critical reception

At the end of 1980, I Just Can't Stop It appeared in numerous lists of the best albums of the year: NME ranked it 3rd, Sounds ranked it 13th, The Village Voice ranked it 21st and OOR ranked it 41st. In 1995, Spin ranked the album at No. 94 in their list of the top "100 Alternative Albums". Fast 'n' Bulbous ranked the album at number 283 in their list of "The 500 Best Albums Since 1965". A 2002 poll of KCPR DJs ranked it at No. 40 in their list of the "Top 100 Records of the 80s". Les Inrockuptibles included it in their list of "50 Years of Rock 'n' Roll." Music journalist Simon Reynolds lists it as one of the five most important albums of "2-Tone and the Ska Resurrection" in his 2005 book Rip It Up and Start Again: Postpunk 1978–1984. In 2016, Paste ranked I Just Can't Stop It at No. 48 on its list of the 50 best new wave albums.

"Mirror in the Bathroom" was ranked at No. 3 in the NME "Singles of the Year" list and at No. 24 in Sounds "Singles of the Year" list. In 2003, Q ranked the song at No. 517 in their list of the "1001 Best Songs Ever". In 2002, Gary Mulholland included the song in his list This is Uncool: The 500 Best Singles Since Punk Rock. In 2001, Michaelangelo Matos included it in his list of "The Top 100 Singles of the 80s." In 2006, 97x ranked it at No. 186 in their list of "The 500 Best Modern Rock Songs of All Time." In 1990, Robert Christgau ranked "Twist & Crawl" at No. 10 in his list of the best songs of the 1980s.

Track listing

The US LP release of the album on Sire Records added "Tears of a Clown" and "Ranking Full Stop", originally released as double A-sides of a single on 2 Tone Records in 1979 (TT 6). These tracks remained on subsequent CD reissues of the album.

Personnel
Credits are adapted from the album's liner notes.The Beat Dave Wakeling – lead vocals; rhythm guitar
 Ranking Roger – toasting; vocals
 Andy Cox – lead guitar
 David Steele – bass
 Everett Morton – drums
 Saxa – saxophoneProduction and artwork'
 Bob Sargeant – production
 Alvin Clark – engineering
 Mark Dearnley – engineering
 Mike Dunne – engineering
 Trevor Hallesy – engineering
 Nick Rogers – engineering
 Hunt Emerson – artwork

"Thanks to: John Peel, The Specials, Selecter, A/W Hunt Emerson"

Charts

Certifications

References

External links
 

The Beat (British band) albums
1980 debut albums
Sire Records albums
I.R.S. Records albums
Albums produced by Bob Sargeant